Myeloconis is a genus of corticolous (bark-dwelling), crustose lichens in the family Trichotheliaceae. It has four species. The genus was circumscribed in 1996 by Patrick M. McCarthy and John Elix, with M. fecunda assigned as the type species.

Description

Genus Myeloconis is characterised by several unique features. These include a medulla that contains yellow or orange pigments that have not been seen in other lichen species before. The , which is the part of the ascoma that supports the spores, is free and anastomoses at the base.

Although the exact relationship of Myeloconis to other lichen genera is not certain, the characteristics of the fruiting bodies and their contents suggest that Myeloconis may be closely related to the genera Porina and Clathroporina in the family Trichotheliaceae.

Chemistry

The new phenalenone compound, myeloconone A2 (6,7,9-trihydroxy-3,8-dimethoxy-4-methyl-1H-phenalen-1-one), was isolated from Myeloconis erumpens. It is a deep yellow pigment. Leucomyeloconone and myelocoterpene are other lichen products found in the genus.

Species

Myeloconis species occur in lowland tropical forest.

 Myeloconis erumpens  – Papua New Guinea
 Myeloconis fecunda  – Malaysia
 Myeloconis guyanensis  – Guyana
 Myeloconis parva  – Brazil

References

Gyalectales
Lichen genera
Taxa described in 1996
Gyalectales genera
Taxa named by John Alan Elix